Calochroa bicolor is a species of tiger beetle found in South Asia. It is black in colour and has yellow spots on its elytra.

Four subspecies are recognized:
 Calochroa bicolor bicolor (Fabricius, 1781)
 Calochroa bicolor atavus (Horn 1920)
 Calochroa bicolor haemorrhoidalis (Wiedemann 1823)
 Calochroa bicolor xanthospilota Fowler, 1912

References

bicolor
Beetles described in 1781
Beetles of Asia